Çokak may refer to:

 Çokak, Kozan, village in Adana Province, Turkey
 Çokak, Tarsus, village in Mersin Province, Turkey